The Central Artery (officially the John F. Fitzgerald Expressway) is a section of freeway in downtown Boston, Massachusetts; it is designated as Interstate 93, US 1 and Route 3.

The original Artery, constructed in the 1950s, was named after John F. Fitzgerald; it was partly elevated and partly tunneled. Its reputation for congestion inspired the local nicknames "The Distressway," "the largest parking lot in the world", and "the other Green Monster" (the paint of the highway girders shared the same color as the left field wall at Fenway Park). The Artery was significantly rerouted during a 10-year period from the mid-1990s through the early 2000s as part of the Central Artery/Tunnel Project (the "Big Dig"). The present-day Artery is almost entirely directed through the newly constructed O'Neill Tunnel, while the original Artery was demolished and replaced with the Rose Fitzgerald Kennedy Greenway, named after the daughter of John F. Fitzgerald and the mother of John F. Kennedy.

According to Massachusetts Executive Office of Transportation data, the Central Artery runs from the Massachusetts Avenue Connector just beyond Andrew Square in South Boston north to the split with U.S. Route 1 in Charlestown.  Along with the harbor tunnels and the Massachusetts Turnpike (I-90) from Route 128 to East Boston, it is part of the Metropolitan Highway System.

History

A 1926 state report on rapid transit expansion recommended the conversion of the Atlantic Avenue Elevated to an elevated highway; however, it closed in 1938 and was demolished in 1942. The above-ground Artery was built in two sections in the 1950s. First was the part north of High Street and Broad Street to the Tobin Bridge, built between 1951 and 1954. Immediately, residents began to hate the new highway and the way it towered over and separated neighborhoods. Due to this opposition, the southern end of the Central Artery through the South Station area was built underground, through what became known as the Dewey Square Tunnel. Eventually, the entire highway was moved underground as part of the Big Dig Project. The Dewey Square Tunnel was the one part of the original Artery not torn down; it now serves southbound traffic. The idea of building the entire Artery underground was first floated in the 1970s emanating from the central artery depression concept developed by the Boston Transportation Planning Review. The final section through the Dewey Square Tunnel and on to the Southeast Expressway at Massachusetts Avenue opened in 1959.

The highway gradually became more and more congested as other highway projects meant to complement the Artery were canceled. These included the Inner Belt project, which would have taken through traffic off the Artery and the Massachusetts Turnpike Extension coming in from the west. The Southwest Expressway  would have been the route of Interstate 95 from Canton into Boston, and would have tied into the Inner Belt of I-695.

Modifications of the above-ground Artery, which was in service until its demolition in 2003 included an additional interchange for the Massachusetts Turnpike (Mass Pike) extension that was completed in 1965, the removal of several on and off-ramps and the reworking in the late 1980s of the Tobin Bridge interchange. The Central Artery North Area (CANA) project placed the above ground ramps from the Artery underground into the City Square Tunnel in Charlestown and resulted in a reworking of the interchange at the north end, placing the northbound offramp from the east side to the west side, and eliminating dangerous weaving across the lanes of the Charlestown High Bridge, which required traffic coming from Storrow Drive and wanting to go to Charlestown to cross three lanes of traffic in only a tenth of a mile.

In September 2017, a new park was opened beneath the Central Artery adjacent to the Ink Block section of Boston's South End. The $8.5 million park has a dog park, new lighting, boardwalks, murals, and 175 parking spaces. The artwork in the public space was created by street artists from around the United States.

Exit lists

The original Central Artery did not have any exit numbers. These were added after the roadway was designated as I-93 in 1974. Many of these exits either do not exist or no longer resemble their original forms. Exits 19, 21, and 25 were completely eliminated. 16 and 18 (formerly exits 20 and 26) were separated northbound and southbound; 16 (former exit 20) northbound uses the old exit 19 location in South Bay, while southbound begins at the portal to the renovated Dewey Square Tunnel (now completely enclosed by Big Dig construction; 18 (former exit 26) northbound begins just shy of the tunnel exit onto the Zakim Bridge, while 18 (former exit 26) southbound is located in Charlestown's Sullivan Square near northbound exit 20 (formerly exit 28) at the portal to the double decked section of I-93 and feeds onto the Leverett Circle Connector bridge. Former exit 22 continued to exist as an offramp to Chinatown from the southbound (former northbound) Dewey Square tunnel until the ramp was closed off in 2004. 23 exists both northbound (now new exit 17) and southbound (now new exit 16B) and leads to the Scollay Square area. 17A-B southbound (formerly exit 24) now exits to Haymarket Square and MA-1A (the Callahan Tunnel). Much of the reconfiguration of on and offramps (particularly the wide separations of the ramps for exits 16 and 18) was done to move exiting traffic off the mainline of the road, reducing stress on the mainline.

Pre-Big Dig

The entire route was in Boston, Suffolk County.

Post-Big Dig
The entire route is in Boston, Suffolk County. Exit numbers on I-93 will eventually change to a mileage-based exit numbering as part of Massachusetts Exit Renumbering Project.

Numbering

Currently, the Artery is numbered I-93 and US 1 on the whole route, and Route 3 on all but the northernmost section—it leaves at exit 18 (former exit 26).

The Artery has had many different route numbers through its history. When first built, the section between the Sumner Tunnel and Storrow Drive received the numbers C1 and C9 (city routes of US 1 and Route 9), which were rerouted off local streets. The rest of the highway was unnumbered, despite being closely paralleled by C37 south from the Sumner Tunnel.

By 1969, I-95 was assigned to the whole Artery as part of its never-built route through Boston. The "C-prefixed" routes were removed in 1971, with Route C1 becoming part of a realigned US 1, using the Artery between Storrow Drive and the Sumner Tunnel. Additionally in 1971, Route 3 was moved from a bypass around downtown to use the Artery south of Storrow Drive and the Southeast Expressway.

In 1974, I-95 was canceled through Boston (cancelling its approach from Providence, Rhode Island through the Southwest Corridor) and was instead rerouted around the city using part of Route 128. US 1 was realigned to use the Tobin Bridge and Northeast Expressway, which had been signed as part of I-95; thus US 1 used the Artery north of Storrow Drive. The former alignment of US 1 from Storrow Drive south along the Artery to the Sumner Tunnel became an extended 1A, and I-93 was extended south from Charlestown along the Artery, Southeast Expressway and Route 128 from Braintree to Canton. In 1989, US 1 was moved off the MDC Parkways onto its current alignment along the full Artery. Route 1A was then truncated to the Sumner Tunnel interchange.

Signs put up for the new underground Artery only mention I-93, since it is the best-known designation. Older signs may mention only I-93 and US 1 or I-93 and Route 3. A 2008/2009 project to update this signage helped to clear up this potentially confusing situation.

See also

Notes

References

National Bridge Inventory database

Transportation in Boston
Roads in Massachusetts
U.S. Route 1
Interstate 95
Interstate 93
Demolished highways in the United States
Transportation in Suffolk County, Massachusetts